The 1936 North Carolina gubernatorial election was held on November 3, 1936. Democratic nominee Clyde R. Hoey defeated Republican nominee Gilliam Grissom with 66.69% of the vote.

Primary elections
Primary elections were held on May 24, 1936.

Democratic primary

Candidates
Clyde R. Hoey, former U.S. Representative
Ralph McDonald, State Representative 
Alexander H. Graham, incumbent Lieutenant Governor
John A. McRae

Results

Republican convention

Candidates
Gilliam Grissom, former North Carolina Collector of Internal Revenue
Irvin B. Tucker, former United States Attorney for the Eastern District of North Carolina

Results

General election

Candidates
Clyde R. Hoey, Democratic
Gilliam Grissom, Republican

Results

References

1936
North Carolina
Gubernatorial